Qaralar-e Tasuji (also Romanized as Qarālar-e Ţasūjī; also known as Qarehlar) is a village in Nazluchay Rural District of Nazlu District of Urmia County, West Azerbaijan province, Iran. At the 2006 National Census, its population was 2,279 in 428 households. The following census in 2011 counted 2,580 people in 591 households. The latest census in 2016 showed a population of 2,844 people in 686 households; it was the largest village in its rural district.

References 

Urmia County

Populated places in West Azerbaijan Province

Populated places in Urmia County